Prince Karel of Schwarzenberg (born 10 December 1937) is a Czech politician, former leader of the TOP 09 party and was its candidate for president of the Czech Republic in the 2013 election. He served as a member of the Chamber of Deputies (MP) from 2010 to 2021.

From July 1990 to July 1992 Schwarzenberg served as the chancellor (director of the presidential office) to Václav Havel, while he was president. He went on to be elected as Senator for the municipal district Prague 6 from 2004 to 2010 and to serve as Minister of Foreign Affairs of the Czech Republic from 2007 to 2009 and again from 2010 to 2013, originally as a non-partisan minister nominated by the Green Party. In May 2010, he was elected as a Member of Parliament for the newly founded pro-European centre-right party TOP 09, gaining the largest number of preference votes. He was candidate for President of the Czech Republic in the 2013 presidential election, and qualified for the second round, finishing as runner-up, with 45.19% of the votes. Schwarzenberg is noted for his pro-European views.

Schwarzenberg has been the head of the House of Schwarzenberg, a formerly leading family of the Habsburg empire, since 1979. He is related to Prince Felix of Schwarzenberg, a statesman of the Austrian Empire. From 1948 to 1990, he lived in Austria, where he was known as Karl Schwarzenberg, and was involved in politics for the Austrian People's Party and became a noted critic of human-rights violations in the Eastern Bloc, chairing the International Helsinki Federation for Human Rights. Following the fall of communism, he became a close adviser to Václav Havel and relocated to Prague.

He is married to Countess Therese von Hardegg (Therese Gräfin zu Hardegg auf Glatz und im Machlande) and they have three children, all of whom live in Austria. His full noble title and style is: His Serene Highness The 12th Prince of Schwarzenberg (First Majorat) and 7th Prince of Schwarzenberg (Second Majorat), Count of Sulz, Princely Landgrave in Klettgau, Duke of Krumlov (Czech: Karel Jan Nepomuk Josef Norbert Bedřich Antonín Vratislav Menas kníže ze Schwarzenbergu; German: Karl Johannes Nepomuk Josef Norbert Friedrich Antonius Wratislaw Menas Fürst zu Schwarzenberg).

Background, education and personal life
The House of Schwarzenberg originates in Franconia, where the family still owns substantial property, but made Bohemia their primary seat in the 17th century, also maintaining residences in Vienna. The family had possessed fiefdoms in Bohemia as far back as the Middle Ages; it was one of the richest noble families of Bohemia and Austria-Hungary, and one of the largest land owners of Bohemia.

Karel Schwarzenberg is the eldest son of Prince Karel VI of Schwarzenberg of the junior line (Second Majorat of the House of Schwarzenberg), and Princess Antonie von Fürstenberg. He is the 1,322nd Knight of the Order of the Golden Fleece of Austria. He is first cousin of Princess Ira and Prince Egon von Fürstenberg and second cousin of Rainier III, Prince of Monaco.  By tradition, he holds the style of Serene Highness.

Schwarzenberg was born in Prague and his family spoke both German and Czech. He is known today for his "slightly archaic and often earthy Czech." Schwarzenberg and his parents had to leave the country after the Communist coup of 1948, and emigrated to Austria, with Swiss citizenship.  He studied law and forestry at the universities of Vienna, Munich and Graz but left studies prior Graduation. He has two sisters, Marie Eleonore von Bredow (born 1936) and Dr. Anna Maria Freiin von Haxthausen (born 1946), and one brother, Dr. rer. oec. Friedrich Prinz zu Schwarzenberg (born 1940).

On 22 April 1967, in Seefeld, Schwarzenberg married Countess Therese zu Hardegg (b. Vienna, 17 February 1940).  The marriage ended in divorce in 1988.  The couple married for a second time on 25 July 2008. His wife spends most of her time in Vienna and does not speak Czech. The marriage bore three children:

Prince Johannes Nepomucenus Andreas Heinrich Joseph Karl Ferdinand Johannes Evangelist die Heiligen Drei Könige Achaz Michael Maria, Hereditary Prince of Schwarzenberg (b. 13 December 1967) married firstly to Diana Orgovanyi-Hanstein (granddaughter of Baroness Maximiliane von Berg) on 20 March 2010. The couple divorced 7 years later and Johannes married Donna Francesca Riario-Sforza, daughter of Duke of San Paolo, on 8 April 2017.
Princess Anna Carolina Antoinette Elisabeth Theresia Olga Adelheid Maria of Schwarzenberg (b. 16 December 1968) she married Peter Morgan on 28 July 1997 (civilly) and on 6 September 1997 (religiously). They have five children:
Gioia Maria Morgan (1999)
Robin Leopold Morgan (2001)
Karol Benjamin Morgan (2004)
Mr. Morgan (2006)
Lászlo Morgan (2011)
Prince Karl Philipp Ernst Ferdinand Alwig Kilian of Schwarzenberg (12 May 1979) adopted by Austrian industrialist and politician Thomas Prinzhorn by agreement 25 November 1987. He married Countess Anna Elisabeth Aline Henriette Maria Benedikta Stephanie Johanna Lidvine Walpurga Thekla von und zu Eltz genannt Faust von Stromberg on 3 October 2009.

After the fall of the communist regime, Schwarzenberg returned to Prague in 1990, although he still occasionally visits Austria, where part of his family lives. He holds both Swiss and Czech citizenship.

Schwarzenberg is the second Czech Patron of The English College in Prague, succeeding the founding Patron Vaclav Havel after the latter's death. He is joint patron with King Charles.

Exile, human-rights activism and career in Austrian politics

In the 1960s, Schwarzenberg was active in the conservative Austrian People's Party and contributed to reforming the party before the 1966 legislative election. Voices inside the party considered him a possible candidate for the position of Foreign Minister of Austria, the position he would occupy in the Czech Republic decades later.

He soon became active in the resistance against the communist dictatorship in Czechoslovakia and became a prominent human-rights advocate, and a leading voice against the communist rule of his native country after the Prague Spring. From 1984 to 1991 he was chairman of the International Helsinki Federation for Human Rights, and in 1986 he founded the Dokumentationszentrum zur Förderung der unabhängigen tschechoslowakischen Literatur in Scheinfeld, West Germany. In 1989, he accepted the European Human Rights Prize on behalf of the International Helsinki Federation for Human Rights.

Career in Czech politics

A long-time friend and close collaborator of Václav Havel, he served for two years as Havel's chancellor (from July 1990 to July 1992) during Havel's tenure as president.

Senator
He was elected as a Senator in the Czech Senate from the 6th District of Prague on 13 November 2004, having been nominated by the Freedom Union – Democratic Union (US-DEU) and Civic Democratic Alliance (ODA) parties, and served until 29 May 2010.

While a senator, he was expelled from Cuba in May 2005 (together with German MP Arnold Vaatz), where he was due to meet dissidents opposed to the Cuban President Fidel Castro.

Foreign Minister of the Czech Republic

Between 9 January 2007 and 9 May 2009, he was Minister of Foreign Affairs of the Czech Republic in Mirek Topolánek's second coalition government. His nomination by the Green Party caused a small controversy when President Václav Klaus stated that he had strong links to Austria and so would not be able to defend national interests.
On 8 July 2008, he and the American Secretary of State Condoleezza Rice signed an agreement on the United States's Missile shield program.

In the first half of 2009, Schwarzenberg was also the Council President (Responsible national minister) of the European Union. Also in 2009, he and coalition colleague Miroslav Kalousek formed a new Czech political party TOP 09, which they led to success in the general elections of 2010, gaining 16% of the vote and representation in the Czech Parliament.

He left office as Foreign Minister on 8 May 2009. He became Foreign Minister once again on 13 July 2010; he held the post until 10 July 2013.

Candidate for President of the Czech Republic

On 11–12 January 2013, Schwarzenberg successfully took part in the first round of Czech presidential elections, the first popular vote for presidency of the country. With 23.40% of the total vote, he finished second behind former prime minister Miloš Zeman (24.21%). In the second-round run-off between the two men, held on 25–26 January 2013, Schwarzenberg received 45.19% of the vote and thus lost to Zeman.

Political positions

Position on communist crimes

In December 2010, Schwarzenberg, along with the foreign ministers of five other Central and Eastern European EU countries, called upon the European Commission to make "the approval, denial or belittling of communist crimes" an EU-wide criminal offence. Schwarzenberg said that the denial of the crimes of communism is analogous to denying the crimes of Nazism, which in many EU countries is a criminal offense, arguing that "there is a fundamental concern here that totalitarian systems be measured by the same standard."

Condemnation of the Beneš decrees

In January 2013, while running for President of the Czech Republic, Schwarzenberg stated, referring to the Beneš decrees, that "what we committed in 1945 would today be considered a grave violation of human rights and the Czechoslovak government, along with President Beneš, would have found themselves in The Hague," referring to the International Criminal Court. The decrees led to the expulsion of many Germans and Hungarians from Czechoslovakia by the Czechoslovak government of Edvard Beneš.

Israel
Schwarzenberg expressed support for Israel's right to defend itself during the Gaza–Israel conflict.

Titles, names and awards

Titles and names
A member of the high nobility of Bohemia, his full name is Karl Johannes Nepomuk Josef Norbert Friedrich Antonius Wratislaw Mena Fürst zu Schwarzenberg in German and Karel Jan Nepomucký Josef Norbert Bedřich Antonín Vratislav Menas kníže ze Schwarzenberga in Czech. He is generally known as Karl zu Schwarzenberg in German and uses the Czech form of his first name, Karel, in Czech.

Karel Schwarzenberg is the current 12th Prince of Schwarzenberg, through his adoption by Heinrich Schwarzenberg, the brother of Joseph Schwarzenberg, the 11th Prince and last male member of the major Schwarzenberg line (First Majorat). Although Heinrich died before his brother Joseph III (the 11th Prince), the adoption allowed Karel Schwarzenberg to succeed to the major Schwarzenberg line. Thus, in his person the minor line (Second Majorat), of which he is part by origin, has been united with the major line.

In the Czech Republic, using of noble predicates is prohibited by law No. 61/1918 Sb. In Austria, noble predicates have been illegal since 1918 (i.e. nearly 20 years before his birth). If Schwarzenberg were to use his titles, his name and style would be:
His Serene Highness The Prince of Schwarzenberg, Count of Sulz, Princely Landgrave in Klettgau, and Duke of Krumlov.

Awards
In 1989, he received together with Lech Wałęsa, later president of Poland, the Council of Europe Human Rights Prize.
In 2003, he received the Order of Tomáš Garrigue Masaryk 3rd Class of the Czech Republic.
He has also been a Knight of the Order of the Golden Fleece (Austrian branch) since 1991.
In 2005, he received the Decoration for Services to the Republic of Austria in Silver with Sash.
In 2008, he received the Grand Cross of the Federal Cross of Merit – Bundesverdienstkreuz – of the Federal Republic of Germany.
In 2010, he received the Bene Merito honorary badge from the Republic of Poland
In 2012, he received the Order of Merit of the Free State of Saxony – Sächsischer Verdienstorden – in Dresden, Saxony.
In 2015, he received the Marietta and Friedrich Torberg Medal
Schwarzenberg is also a regular attendant to the Trilateral Commission and the Bilderberg meetings.

Ancestry

See also
 Palais Schwarzenberg
 Orlík nad Vltavou

Footnotes

External links

  Official website
 
 Profile in European Voice, 19 July 2007
  Blog

1937 births
Austrian anti-communists
Czech anti-communists
Foreign Ministers of the Czech Republic
Grand Crosses 1st class of the Order of Merit of the Federal Republic of Germany
Recipients of the Order of Merit of the Free State of Saxony
Karel
Living people
Marietta and Friedrich Torberg Medal recipients
Members of the Senate of the Czech Republic
Politicians from Prague
Recipients of the Decoration for Services to the Republic of Austria
Recipients of the Order of Tomáš Garrigue Masaryk
Knights of the Golden Fleece of Austria
Czech nobility
TOP 09 MPs
Candidates in the 2013 Czech presidential election
TOP 09 presidential candidates
Mayors and Independents presidential candidates
Civic Democratic Alliance Senators
Leaders of TOP 09
Green Party (Czech Republic) Senators
TOP 09 Government ministers
Green Party (Czech Republic) Government ministers
Members of the Chamber of Deputies of the Czech Republic (2010–2013)
Members of the Chamber of Deputies of the Czech Republic (2013–2017)
Members of the Chamber of Deputies of the Czech Republic (2017–2021)
Swiss people of Czech descent
Recipients of the Order of Prince Yaroslav the Wise, 2nd class